Marcel Lux (born 27 July 1994) is a Slovak volleyball player for VK Mirad Prešov and the Slovak national team.

He participated at the 2017 Men's European Volleyball Championship.

References

1994 births
Living people
Slovak men's volleyball players
Sportspeople from Prešov
Volleyball players at the 2015 European Games
European Games competitors for Slovakia